This is a list of Northwestern Wildcats football players in the NFL first round Draft.

Key

Selections

Notable undrafted players
Note: No drafts held before 1920

References

Northwestern

Northwestern Wildcats NFL Draft